Lady Winsley (Lit.: Who Killed Lady Winsley?) is a Franco-Turko-Belgian comedy noir murder mystery detective film directed by Hiner Saleem.

Plot
Lady Winsley, an American novelist and investigative journalist, is murdered in Büyükada, an island in the Prince archipelago in Turkey. Inspector Fergün arrives from Istanbul to head the investigation. With the help of Azra, the hotel owner at which he is staying at, he has to deal with a distrustful and secretive tight-knit community which harbours numerous taboos, ethnic tensions, has strong family ties, and is attached to ancient traditions.

Cast
Mehmet Kurtulus: Fergan, detective
Ezgi Mola: Azra, hotel owner
Ahmet Uz: Kasim
Mesut Akusta: Ismail
Ergun Kuyucu: Captain Celik
Senay Gürler: Lady Winsley
Turgay Avdın: Burak Ozluk, journalist
Korkmaz Aslan: Sercan Birol

References

External links

 - AlloCiné

2019 films
French crime comedy films
Belgian crime comedy films
Turkish crime comedy films
2010s Turkish-language films
2010s crime comedy films
2010s French films